Lara & Reyes  was the seventh album released by the flamenco-influenced Latin guitar instrumental duo Lara & Reyes. This album won an Indie Acoustic Project Award in 2007 in the category of "Best Latin Album".

Track listing
"Oh, Shake it" – 3:54
"Shoreline Horses" – 6:40	 
"Le Gret" – 3:38
"Saloon Rag" – 1:04
"Flamgrass" – 6:40	 
"Old Wolf" – 6:15 
"Cat Cy" – 4:29 
"Possum Blues" – 2:02 
"Miss So & So" – 3:32
"Waltz 45" – 6:07
"Lonesome Mandolin" – 1:45

References

2006 debut albums
Lara & Reyes albums